The Road is an upcoming Indian Tamil-language drama film directed by Arun Vaseegaran and produced by AAA Cinemaa, starring Trisha and Shabeer.

Cast

Production 
The title of the film was revealed on 25 April 2022 by announcing the cast Sarpatta Parambarai actors Santhosh Prathap and Shabeer, Miya George, Vivek Prasanna, MS Bhaskar and Vela Ramamoorthy. The film was almost completed in July 2022. The director confirmed that Trisha will be playing lead role in the film. The first look of the film was released on the birthday of actress Trisha.

References

External links 
 The Road on Cinestaan

Indian drama films
Upcoming Tamil-language films